Unintimidated is a pro-Scott Walker super PAC. The PAC was formed in April 2015 by some of Walker's campaign aides to assist with fundraising efforts. It is led by Keith Gilkes, Walker's former chief of staff. 

Unintimidated PAC’s $1 million donors become members of the “Executive Board” and are promised: bi-annual retreats, member-only briefings and conference calls, two private dinners with VIP special guests, and dedicated staff contact to cater to their needs. Other big donors can be members of the “Executive Committee” ($500,000 level) and the “Platinum Membership” ($250,000), and get similar perks.

Donations received 
These are among the donations received:
 $150,000 from HF Securities LLC, registered to J. Patrick Hammes, the son of Jon Hammes, Milwaukee Bucks owner and Walkers co-chair of fundraising for his 2016 presidential campaign

See also
 Peter Fitzgerald (politician), Chairman of Chain Bridge Bank, N.A.
 501(c)(4) organizations
 527 group
 Campaign finance in the United States
 Issue advocacy ads
 Lobbying in the United States
 Money loop
 Politics of the United States
 Soft money
 Republican Party presidential candidates, 2016
 Scott Walker presidential campaign, 2016
 Our American Revival (organization)
 Wisconsin Club for Growth

References

External links
 http://si.wsj.net/public/resources/images/BN-IM844_Walker_GV_20150519174920.jpg
 http://docquery.fec.gov/pdf/390/15031413390/15031413390.pdf
 http://www.unintimidatedpac.com

United States political action committees